The economy of Dhaka is the largest in the Peoples Republic of Bangladesh, contributing $162 billion in nominal gross state product and $235 billion in purchasing power parity terms as of 2020. The economy of Dhaka contributes 40% of Bangladesh's gross domestic product. If Dhaka were a sovereign nation, it would rank as the 50th largest economy in the world and fourth largest economy in South Asia, ahead of Myanmar, Sri Lanka, Nepal, Bhutan, Maldives, Afghanistan and behind India, Bangladesh and Pakistan. Dhaka also boast the highest per capita GDP in South Asia.

Headquarters of  major Bangladeshi financial institutions as Dhaka Stock Exchange, Bangladesh Bank, as well as major companies such as BEXIMCO, Bashundhara Group, PRAN-RFL Group, Dhaka serves as the financial hub of the country. Regional headquarters of many multi-national institutions such as GlaxoSmithKline, HeidelbergCement, Reckitt Benckiser, HSBC, British American Tobacco and Nestlé are also located in Dhaka. Dhaka Stock Exchange is the largest stock exchange in Bangladesh, and second largest in South Asia with a Market capitalization of $48 billion.

History
Due to its location right beside some main river routes, Dhaka was an important centre for business. Muslin fabric was produced and traded in this area.

Italian traveller Niccolao Manucci came to Dhaka in 1662–63. According to him, there were only two kuthis (trading posts) – one of the English and the other of the Dutch. Ships were loaded with fine white cotton and silk fabrics.

Sectors

The manufacture of brick in Dhaka's suburbs, which adds little to gross national product, adds significantly to PM2.5 air pollution.

Environmental sector
Founded in 1996, Waste Concern is a Bangladeshi Social Business Enterprise (SBE) for waste recycling that offers solutions for waste management.

International trade and other sectors
Dhaka has historically derived significant revenue from International trade, Textile, Pharmachemical and financial institutions. The exports of goods made in Dhaka totalled approximately US$10 billion in 2012, with a rapid growth in Pharmachemical, and IT with 15.68% and 7.28% growth.

See also
 Economy of Bangladesh
 Apan Jewellers

References